List of ferry operators in Japan lists car ferry operators in Japan. The list includes companies operating now. It also lists foreign operators that have international car ferry lines to Japan. English names might be tentative.

International

China
China Express Line  (Yānjīng )
China Japan International Ferry  (Xīnjiànzhēn )
Tianjin Jīn-Shén Ferry  (Yānjīng )

Japan
Camellia Line 
Shanghai Ferry 
SHK Line Group 
Kampu Ferry 
Suzhou Shimonoseki Ferry 
Freight only. Plans to operate a passenger service as well.

Korea, South
PanStar Ferry 팬스타페리
Pukwan Ferry 부관페리

Russia
Sakhalin Shipping Company (SASCO) Сахалинское морское пароходство

Inter-regional

A" Line 
Marix Line 
Miyazaki Car Ferry 
MOL Group 
MOL Ferry 
Meimon Taiyō Ferry 
Ferry Sunflower 
SHK Line Group 
Hankyū Ferry 
Shin Nihonkai Ferry 
Ocean Trans 
Taiheiyō Ferry

Hokkaidō

Haboro Enkai Ferry 
Heart Land Ferry

Hokkaidō — Tōhoku
Tsugaru Kaikyō Ferry 
Kawasaki Kinkai Kisen  (Silver Ferry )
Kitanihon Kaiun  (Seikan Ferry )
Kyōei Unyu  (Seikan Ferry )

Tōhoku region
Ajishima Line 
Mutsuwan Ferry 
Ōshima Kisen

Kantō region

Tōkyō-Wan Ferry

Chūbu region
Isewan Ferry 
Meitetsu Kaijō Kankōsen 
Sado Steam Ship 
S-Pulse Dream Ferry  (Surugawan Ferry )

Kansai region
Nankai Ferry

Chūgoku region
Oki Kisen

Inland Sea

Habu Shōsen 
Ishizaki Kisen 
Nakajima Kisen 
Jumbo Ferry 
Kyōwa Kisen 
Miyajima Matsudai Kisen 
Ōmishima Ferry 
Ōsaki Kisen 
Ryōbi Holdings  (Ryōbi Ferry )
Kokusai Ferry 
Setouchi Kankō Kisen 
Sankō Kisen 
Setonaikai Kisen 
Akitsu Ferry 
Bōyo Kisen 
Suō Ōshima Matsuyama Ferry 
Shikoku Ferry 
Shōdoshima Kyūkō Ferry 
Shikoku Kaihatsu Ferry  (Shikoku Orange Ferry )
Shikoku Kisen 
Shimanami Ferry 
Shiyūjima Kaiun 
JR West Miyajima Ferry  (JR Miyajima Ferry )

Chūgoku — Kyūshū
Suōnada Ferry

Shikoku — Kyūshū
Matsuyama Kokura Ferry 
Kokudō Kyūshi Ferry 
Kyūshi Orange Ferry 
Sukumo Ferry 
Uwajima Unyu

Kyūshū region

Amami Kaiun 
Ariake Ferry 
Cosmo Line 
Iwasaki Group 
Kagoshima Shōsen 
Kashō Kaiun 
Tarumi Ferry 
Kagoshima City Shipping Department  (Sakurajima Ferry )
Kumamoto Ferry 
Kyūshū Shōsen 
Koshikijima Shōsen 
Kyūshū Yūsen 
Mishima Village Ferry  (Ferry Mishima )
Nomo Shōsen 
Orita Kisen 
Setouchi Town Ferry  (Ferry Kakeroma )
Shimabara Railway  (Shimatetsu Ferry )
Toshima Village Ferry  (Ferry Toshima )

Okinawa

Aguni Village Ferry 
Anei Kankō 
Daitō Kaiun 
Fukuyama Kaiun 
Hateruma Kaiun 
Ie Village Ferry 
Iheya Village Ferry 
Ishigaki Dream Tours 
Izena Village Ferry 
Kamiya Kankō 
Katsuren Kaiun 
Kudaka Kaiun 
Kume Line 
Tarama Kaiun 
Tokashiki Village Ferry 
Yaeyama Kankō Ferry 
Zamami Village Ferry

See also
List of ferry operators

References

External links

 List of ferry operators in Japan
Ferry operators in Japan
Ferry operators in Japan
Ferry